Alan Kenneth Mayes (born 11 December 1953) is an English retired footballer who made nearly 400 appearances in the Football League during the 1970s and 1980s.

A striker, Mayes started out with Queens Park Rangers and led a journeyman career, playing for Watford, Northampton Town, Swindon Town, Chelsea, Carlisle United, Newport County, Blackpool and Wycombe Wanderers.

References

1953 births
Living people
People from Edmonton, London
English footballers
Association football forwards
Chelsea F.C. players
Swindon Town F.C. players
Queens Park Rangers F.C. players
Carlisle United F.C. players
Watford F.C. players
Blackpool F.C. players
Wycombe Wanderers F.C. players
Northampton Town F.C. players
Newport County A.F.C. players
English Football League players